was a professor of Zoology at Hokkaido University Sapporo in Hokkaidō, Japan. He has authored a variety of publications on the taxonomy of various mammal species endemic to East Asia.

References 
Profile

20th-century Japanese zoologists
Japanese mammalogists
Academic staff of Hokkaido University
1933 births
Living people
Place of birth missing (living people)
Hokkaido University alumni